Fujimorism denotes the policies and the political ideology of former President of Peru Alberto Fujimori as well as the personality cult built around him, his policies and his family, especially Keiko Fujimori. The ideology is defined by authoritarianism, its support for neoliberal economics, opposition to communism, and socially and culturally conservative stances such as opposition to LGBT rights and school curriculums including gender equality or sex education. Opponents of Fujimorism are known as anti-Fujimorists.

Since Alberto Fujimori's election, Fujimorism has continued to maintain influence through the 1993 constitution, its neoliberal policies and the support of extractivism. Political involvement was largely deactivated until 2011 when it was brought back to the forefront by his children, Keiko and Kenji, with Keiko's party Popular Force controlling much of the Congress of the Republic of Peru from 2016 until 2020 through a system that was constitutionally drafted by her father.

History

1990s 
The lack of a stable political-party system in Peru as well as in other countries of Latin America has led many times to the emergence in the political arena of strong personalities without overt ideological affiliations. In Peru, the "surprise" 1990 election of Fujimori to the office of the President. Fujimori led the 1992 Peruvian self-coup, ostensibly directed against domestic terrorists. Following the 1992 crisis, Fujimori would broaden the definition of terrorism in an effort to criminalize as many actions possible to persecute left-wing political opponents. Using the terruqueo, a fearmongering tactic that was used to accuse opponents of terrorism, Fujimori established a cult of personality by portraying himself as a hero and made left-wing ideologies an eternal enemy in Peru. Political scientist Daniel Encinas stated that the terruqueo would evolve into conservative politicians using the attack to target those opposed to Fujimori's neoliberal economic policies and that the right-wing used the tactic as a "strategy of manipulating the legacy of political violence".

In 1993, the Constitution of Peru was rewritten by Fujimori and his supporters and is currently used today. This constitution would later come to benefit Alberto Fujimori's children.

2000s 
Fujimori took refuge in Japan when faced with charges of corruption in 2000. On arriving in Japan he attempted to resign his presidency via fax, but his resignation was rejected by the Congress of the Republic, which preferred to remove him from office by the process of impeachment. Fujimori maintained a self-imposed exile until he was arrested while visiting Chile in November 2005. He was extradited to face criminal charges in Peru in September 2007. In December 2007, Fujimori was convicted of ordering an illegal search and seizure, and was sentenced to six years in prison. The Supreme Court upheld the decision upon his appeal. In April 2009 Fujimori was convicted of human rights violations and sentenced to 25 years in prison for his role in killings and kidnappings by the Grupo Colina death squad during his government's battle against leftist guerrillas in the 1990s.

2010s 

Following Fujimori's fall from power, his self-exile to Japan, his extradition back to Peru and his subsequent trial and imprisonment, there emerged political parties that continued to proclaim to follow the legacy of Alberto Fujimori. The most prominent of these groups that formed in the aftermath of Alberto's downfall is Popular Force (Fuerza Popular), a political party that was created and is led by the former president's daughter Keiko Fujimori, a presidential candidate in 2011 and again in 2016.In March 2017, Popular Force blocked an investigation into alleged sexual abuse within the Catholic church using the justification that it was only intended as an attack on religion.

As a result of the 2016 Peruvian general election, Keiko Fujimori lost the presidential race, though her Popular Force party gained control of Peru's congress while economist Pedro Pablo Kuczynski won the presidency. Shortly after the election, Fujimorist congress immediately began to politically attack President Kuczynski, beginning two impeachment proceedings against the president; a failed attempt in 2017 and another attempt in 2018.

Shortly after the first impeachment vote failed, President Kuczynski pardoned Alberto Fujimori, with Kuczynski, citing Fujimori's health and age as the main reason for his pardoning. Days before the second vote was to occur, Kenji Fujimori – who was then still part of his sister's party Popular Force – was involved in the Kenjivideos scandal where he was seen attempting to buy the votes in favor of President Kuczynski to avoid the president's impeachment. As a result of the scandal, President Kuczynski resigned the presidency.

Following this series of events, First Vice President Martín Vizcarra was sworn into the presidency by the Fujimorist-led congress. During this ceremony, some Peruvians took to the streets to protest against the government, calling for the removal of all politicians. Others have stated that the attacks against President Kuczynski was a conspiracy of the Fujimorists to gain control of Peru's political system once more. Soon after taking office, President Vizcarra made attempts to remove corruption within Peru, proposing a national referendum effort surrounding the country's legislative branch and election funding 28 July 2018. On 3 October 2018, Alberto Fujimori's pardon was overturned by a Peruvian court and a week later on 10 October 2018, Keiko Fujimori was detained by police as part of an investigation surrounding the Odebrecht scandal and money laundering allegations that involved her 2011 presidential campaign. On 23 January 2019, Alberto Fujimori was sent back to prison to complete his sentence with his pardon formally being annulled three weeks later on 13 February 2019.

During their majority in congress, Fujimorists "earned a reputation as hardline obstructionists for blocking initiatives popular with Peruvians aimed at curbing the nation’s rampant corruption" according to the Associated Press.

2020s 
During the 2021 Peruvian general election, the right-wing elite, business groups and the majority of media organizations in Peru collaborated with the campaign of Keiko Fujimori by appealing to fear when discussing political opponents. Media organizations in Peru would use the terruqueo along with fake news in an effort to support Fujimori. Reuters wrote that El Comercio, one of the largest media organizations in South America, "generally backed Fujimori".

Characteristics

Ideology 
Fujimorism is characterized by its social conservatism and has been described as having traits of authoritarianism and fascism. It is also known for strong opposition to left-wing and far-left groups. Fujimorists have signed the Madrid Charter, an anti-leftist manifesto promoted by the far-right Spanish party Vox. The principal foundations of the regime were staunch anti-communism, forceful anti-terrorist actions, pro-free market policies and disregard for political institutions. In terms of the decision-making process, a logic of closed and isolated decision-making at the top became the major characteristic of Fujimori governance. Fujimorism is considered neoliberal economically as it minimized the role of the state functions through privatizations of public companies and by signing contracts with transnational companies to support foreign investment in large sectors.

Parties and alliances 
Self-proclaimed Fujimorist parties and electoral coalitions include Cambio 90, New Majority, Sí Cumple, Peru 2000, Alliance for the Future (2006–2010) and Popular Force (since 2010).

Keiko Fujimori's Popular Force has also allied with the conservative parties Go on Country of Hernando de Soto and Popular Renewal of Rafael López Aliaga, with the parties signing the Madrid Charter of far-right Spanish political part Vox, an anti-leftist manifesto.

See also 
 Pinochetism
 National Intelligence Service (Peru)
 Uribism
 Vladimiro Montesinos

Notes

References 
 Mainwaring, Scott & Ana Maria Bejarano. The Crisis of Democratic Representation in the Andes; Stanford University Press;  2006; 
 Lawson, Kay & Jorge Lanzaro. Political Parties and Democracy: Volume I: The Americas; Praeger;  2010; 
 "Profile: Alberto Fujimori", BBC News, 8 December 2011
 "Daughter of Peru's disgraced Fujimori leads presidential poll", Yahoo News, 10 February 2016

 
Eponymous political ideologies
Neoliberalism
Right-wing populism in South America
Cults of personality